Year 1154 (MCLIV) was a common year starting on Friday (link will display the full calendar) of the Julian calendar.

Events 
 By place 

 Levant 
 April 18 – Nur al-Din, Seljuk ruler (atabeg) of Aleppo, encamps before Damascus and overthrows Mujir al-Din by force  with support of the Jewish citizens, who open the eastern gate to the bulk of his army. Mujir flees to the citadel, but capitulates after only a few hours. He is offered his life and the Emirate of Homs. A few weeks later Mujir is suspected of plotting with old friends in Damascus and is exiled to Baghdad. Damascus is annexed to Zangid territory and all of Syria is unified under the authority of Nur al-Din, from Edessa in the north to the Hauran to the south.
 Nur al-Din establishes the Al-Nuri Hospital in Damascus. The hospital has outpatient consulting rooms, a conference room, prayer hall, vestibules and bathrooms.

 Europe 
 February 26 – King Roger II dies at Palermo after a 24-year reign. He is succeeded by his fourth son William I (the Bad) as ruler of Sicily. William appoints Maio of Bari, a man of low birth, to chancellor and his adviser. He pursues his father's policy of strengthening authority over the towns and the Italian nobles, who rally around his cousin Robert III, count of Loritello, in Apulia and Calabria.
 Autumn – King Frederick I (Barbarossa) leads a expedition into Italy for his imperial coronation. He wants to impose his will upon the towns and cities of Lombardy, a region long accustomed to interference from Germany. Frederick encounters stiff resistance to his authority, the Lombard nobles are unwilling to acknowledge his rule and the rights to raise taxes.
 The Almohad army conquers the last independent Muslim stronghold at Granada (modern Spain), after a six year siege.<ref>Gilbert Meynier (2010). L'Algérie cæur du Maghreb classique. De l'ouverture islamo-arabe au repli (658–1518). Paris: La Dïcouverte; p. 88.</ref>
 The Banate of Bosnia becomes an autonomous duchy as part of the Lands of the Hungarian Crown.
 Tallinn, the capital of Estonia, is first marked on the world map by Muhammad al-Idrisi.

 Africa 
 Normans conduct a series of raids in North Africa, including Annaba (modern Algeria) and the Nile Delta.

 England 
 October 25 – King Stephen dies after a short illness at Dover. He is succeeded by Henry of Anjou, the son of Queen Matilda. 
 December 19 – The 21-year-old Henry II is crowned as sole ruler of England along with his wife Eleanor of Aquitaine.
 The Bull Ring, a commercial market centre, is founded by Peter de Bermingham at Birmingham. 

 By topic 

 Art and Culture 
 January 15 – Muhammad al-Idrisi, Arab geographer and cartographer, completes his atlas of the world, the Tabula Rogeriana'', which will remain one of the most accurate maps until the Age of Discovery.

 Religion 
 December 3 – Pope Anastasius IV dies after a 17-month pontificate. He is succeeded by Adrian IV (the only English pope in history) as the 169th pope of the Catholic Church.

Births 
 November 2 – Constance I, queen of Sicily (d. 1198)
 November 11 – Sancho I, king of Portugal (d. 1211)
 Agnes of Austria, queen of Hungary (d. 1182)
 Benoît de Sainte-Maure, French poet (d. 1173)
 Gyeong Dae-seung, Korean military leader (d. 1183)
 Minamoto no Yoshinaka, Japanese general (d. 1184)
 Muzaffar al-Din Gökböri, Ayyubid general (d. 1233)
 Robert II, count of Dreux and Braine (d. 1218)
 Sohrevardi, Persian philosopher (d. 1191)
 Vsevolod III, Grand Prince of Kiev (d. 1212)

Deaths 
 February 2 – Viacheslav I, Grand Prince of Kiev (b. 1083)
 February 20 – Wulfric of Haselbury, English miracle worker
 February 26 – Roger II, king of Sicily (b. 1095)
 March 8 – Stephen of Obazine, French priest (b. 1085)
April 1 or April 15 – Al-Zafir, Fatimid caliph (b. 1133)
 April 3 – Al-Adil ibn al-Sallar, Fatimid vizier
 June 8 – William of York, English archbishop
 June 9 – Geoffrey of Canterbury, English abbot
 July 20 – Bernard of Hildesheim, German bishop
 July 21 – Elizabeth of Hungary, Polish duchess 
 September 4 – Gilbert de la Porrée, French theologian
 October 25 – Stephen, king of England (b. 1096)
 November 13 – Iziaslav II, Grand Prince of Kiev
 November 18 – Adelaide of Maurienne, French queen (b. 1092)
 December 3 – Anastasius IV, pope of the Catholic Church
 December 12 – Vicelinus, German bishop (b. 1086)
 Donnchad I (or Duncan), Scottish nobleman (b. 1113)
 Ermengol IV (el de Castilla), count of Urgell (b. 1096)
 Faidiva of Toulouse, countess of Savoy (b. 1133)
 Hiyya al-Daudi, Andalusian rabbi and composer 
 Honorius Augustodunensis, French theologian
 Jinadattasuri, Indian Jain poet and writer (b. 1075)
 Lawrence of Durham, English prelate and poet
 Lambert of Bauduen, bishop of Vence (b. 1084)
 Matilda of Anjou, duchess of Normandy (b. 1106)
 Zhang Jun, Chinese general and official (b. 1086)

References